On air or On Air may refer to:

Music
On Air (The Yardbirds album), 1991
On Air (Alan Parsons album), 1996
On Air (John Fahey album), 2004
On Air (Chris Whitley album), 2008
On Air – Live at the BBC Volume 2, by the Beatles, 2013
On Air (Queen album), 2016
On Air (The Rolling Stones album), 2017

Media
 On air, in broadcasting, the state of currently broadcasting or prerecording a program
On Air with Ryan Seacrest (radio), a US radio program
On Air with Ryan Seacrest (TV series), an American talk show
On Air (TV series), a South Korean drama
On Air (journal), published by the Hospital Broadcasting Association

Other
On Air (airline), based in Italy
OnAir (telecommunications), a telecommunications company
OnAir Company, a video game

See also
 On the Air (disambiguation)
Radio broadcasting
Television broadcasting